Eldoradina is a Neotropical genus of butterfly in the family Lycaenidae found in mountainous regions in Peru. It contains two species:
Eldoradina cyanea Balletto, 1993
Eldoradina sylphis (Draudt, 1921)

References

External links
Images representing Eldoradina at Butterflies of the Americas

Polyommatini
Lycaenidae of South America
Lycaenidae genera